Wolfreton School & Sixth Form College is a coeducational secondary school and sixth form located in Willerby, East Riding of Yorkshire, England.

In 2017, the most recent results available, 74% of pupils at Wolfreton School and Sixth Form College gained at least 5 A* to C or 9 to 4 grade GCSEs including English and Maths. During Ofsted's school inspection in October 2021, Wolfreton School and Sixth Form received "Good" ratings in all inspect sections.

History
The school was split over two sites, the Lower School in Willerby and the Upper School in Kirk Ella. In 2014, it was announced that both sites were to be demolished and a new multi-million pound site would be built on the playing field of the Lower School. The new school opened in September 2016.

Wolfreton School & Sixth Form achieves outstanding success in sport and has a long-standing tradition of producing talent who have represented at the highest level.

Houses 
All students and staff are assigned to one of five houses: Nightingale, Owen, Rowntree, Tomlinson, Wilberforce 

The names of the houses were selected by students and are made up of recognised individuals who reflect the Wolfreton School values: Excellence, Endeavour, Respect.

The Consortium Trust
Wolfreton School & Sixth Form College is part of The Consortium Trust along with Hessle High School and Cottingham High School. Founded in 2017, the Trust provides a support network for local schools and Sixth Form colleges.

Rushanje School, Uganda
Wolfreton School staff travel over to help develop Rushanje School in Mbarara, Uganda, and form The Wolfreton Rushanje Community Partnership. A new Science and Humanities block built at Wolfreton's Upper School site was named 'Rushanje House' in honour of the relationship.

Notable alumni
 Caroline Bilton — BBC Look North presenter and reporter
Josh Bowden — Professional rugby player
 Robert Crampton — Journalist for The Times
Abbie Eaton — Racing driver working on The Grand Tour 
Chris Green — Professional rugby player
 Annabelle Lewis — Sprinter, won bronze for Great Britain in Women's 4x100 relay at the 2013 World Championships
Jordan Metcalfe — Actor, known for The Queen's Nose and Genie in the House
 Garreth Roberts — Hull City footballer and captain. One of the club's longest serving players from 1978–1992
 Tracey Seaward — Award-winning film producer known for The Queen, The Two Popes, and producer of the 2012 London Olympics opening ceremony

References

External links

 Wolfreton School & Sixth Form College
The Consortium Trust

Secondary schools in the East Riding of Yorkshire
Academies in the East Riding of Yorkshire